SS Joseph M. Terrell was a Liberty ship built in the United States during World War II. She was named after Joseph M. Terrell, a United States Senator and the 57th Governor of Georgia.

Construction
Joseph M. Terrell was laid down on 23 December 1943, under a Maritime Commission (MARCOM) contract, MC hull 1515, by J.A. Jones Construction, Brunswick, Georgia; she was sponsored by Mrs. W. Franklin Jones, the daughter-in-law of James Addison Jones, and launched on 14 February 1944.

History
She was allocated to R.A. Nichol & Company, on 26 February 1944. On 24 October 1947, she was laid up in the National Defense Reserve Fleet in Mobile, Alabama. On 17 June 1966, to Union Minerals & Alloys, Corp., for $45,568.79, for scrapping. She was delivered on 29 June 1966.

References

Bibliography

 
 
 
 
 

 

Liberty ships
Ships built in Brunswick, Georgia
1944 ships
Mobile Reserve Fleet